Karim El-Zoghby (born 15 February 1977) is an Egyptian Olympic show jumping rider. He competed at three Summer Olympics (in 2008, 2012 and 2016).His best Olympic result came in 2016 when he placed 40th in the individual competition with the horse Amelia.

El-Zoghby participated at four World Equestrian Games (in 2002, 2006, 2010 and 2014). He finished 21st in the team competition in 2014, while his best individual placement is 56th place from 2010. El-Zoghny also participated at several regional games, including the 2007 Pan Arab Games where he won team and individual silvers.

References

Living people
1977 births
Egyptian male equestrians
Equestrians at the 2008 Summer Olympics
Equestrians at the 2012 Summer Olympics
Equestrians at the 2016 Summer Olympics
Olympic equestrians of Egypt
Mediterranean Games bronze medalists for Egypt
Mediterranean Games medalists in equestrian
Competitors at the 2005 Mediterranean Games
20th-century Egyptian people
21st-century Egyptian people